Mariahof is a former municipality in the district of Murau in Styria, Austria. Since the 2015 Styria municipal structural reform, it is part of the municipality Neumarkt in der Steiermark.

Geography
Mariahof lies in the valley of the Mur on the pass road between the Mur valley and the Metnitz valley.

References

Cities and towns in Murau District